Luis J. Montaner is a researcher at The Wistar Institute in Philadelphia. His main research focus is the HIV-1 virus and how new immune therapies can strengthen the immune system and offer better treatment options for infected patients.

Montaner's laboratory has made several discoveries concerning potential HIV and AIDS treatments. In 2012, his laboratory reported that the AIDS virus could be suppressed by boosting the immune system, thereby reducing patients' reliance on existing antiviral drugs. In 2014, it was announced that the AIDS service organization Philadelphia FIGHT has partnered with the Wistar Institute on the largest clinical trial to date that would use interferon to strengthen the immune system in patients infected with the HIV-1 virus. The clinical trial is supported by a four-year, $6.2 million grant.

References

Cancer researchers
Living people
American medical researchers
HIV/AIDS researchers
Place of birth missing (living people)
Year of birth missing (living people)